The Spirit of Good is a lost 1920 American silent drama film directed by Paul Cazeneuve and starring Madlaine Traverse. It was produced and distributed by Fox Film Corporation.

Cast
Madlaine Traverse as Nell Gordon
Fred R. Stanton as Neal Bradford (credited as Frederick Stanton)
Dick La Reno as Chuck Lang
Charles Smiley as Reverend Josiah Calvin
Clo King as Jerusha Calvin
Buck Jones (uncredited) (Buck Gebhart)

References

External links

1920 films
American silent feature films
Lost American films
American black-and-white films
Fox Film films
Silent American drama films
1920 drama films
1920 lost films
Lost drama films
Films directed by Paul Cazeneuve
1920s American films